El Nath may refer to:

 Alpha Arietis
 Beta Tauri
 El-Nath, a town in the popular MMORPG, MapleStory